Janice Bishop is a planetary scientist known for her research into the minerals found on Mars.

Education and career 
In 1988, Bishop earned a B.S. in chemistry and an M.S. in Applied Earth Science from Stanford University. She earned her Ph.D. from Brown University in 1994 and then was a postdoctoral associate at the German Aerospace Center in Berlin until 1997. From 1997 to 1999 she was a fellow at the National Aeronautics Space Agency (NASA) Ames Research Center before becoming a research scientist at the SETI Institute. Starting in 2015 she joined the Science Council at the SETI Institute and is a contractor at the NASA Ames Research Center.

In 2020 she was elected a fellow of the American Geophysical Union for:

Research 
Bishop uses Raman spectroscopy to examine minerals that may be found on Mars and examines minerals on Earth that serve as proxies for conditions on Mars. Through this research Bishop has analyzed water in minerals such as montmorillonite and used hyperspectral imaging to identify phyllosilicates on minerals from Earth. On Mars, Bishop's research revealed these phyllosilicates are indicative of the presence of water. In 2011, Bishop examined carbonate rocks in the Mojave Desert as an analogue for conditions that may occur on Mars and her subsequent research revealed the wide-spread presence of rocks with carbonate on Mars which could be indicative of potential life on Mars. Using data from instruments on the Curiosity rover, Bishop and colleagues found presence of glauconitic clays which only form in bodies of water that remain still for long periods of time. In 2021, Bishop determined that dark streaks on Mars, called recurring slope lineae, can be the result of the interactions of sulfates and chlorine salts that absorb water, a condition that leads to landslides.

Selected publications

Awards and honors 

 Kavli Fellow (2008)
 Helmholtz International Fellow Award (2013)
Marion L. and Chrystie M. Jackson Mid-Career Clay Scientist Award, The Clay Minerals Society (2016)
 Fellow, Geological Society of America (2018)
 Fellow, Mineralogical Society of America (2018)
 Fellow, American Geophysical Union (2020)
 G. K. Gilbert Award for outstanding contributions to planetary geology (2021)

References

External links 
 
, August 28, 2009

Fellows of the American Geophysical Union
Fellows of the Geological Society of America
Brown University alumni
Stanford University alumni
Women planetary scientists
Planetary scientists
American geologists
Living people
Year of birth missing (living people)
Women geologists